Acicarpha is a genus of flowering plants in the family Calyceraceae, native to drier areas of southern South America. They prefer to grow alongside rivers or the shores of the Atlantic Ocean.

Species
Currently accepted species include:

Acicarpha bonariensis (Pers.) Herter
Acicarpha obtusisepala Marchesi
Acicarpha procumbens Less.
Acicarpha runcinata Miers
Acicarpha tribuloides Juss.

References

Calyceraceae
Asterales genera